Glen Cao (born 1947) is also known by his Chinese name, Cao Guilin (曹桂林). He is the author of Beijinger in New York. Mr. Cao wrote the book largely based on his own life experiences as an immigrant to New York City from Beijing in 1980. The novel sold millions of copies in China and went on to become serialized in a news paper, and then subsequently made into a TV series, aired on CCTV. He is also the founder of C & J Knitwear Company. He is married to director Ying Yeh (英业).

External links
Article about Glen Cao at International Herald Tribune
 Beijinger in New York e-text
Picture of Glen Cao and Ying Yeh

Living people
1947 births
American writers of Chinese descent
20th-century Chinese writers
Writers from Beijing
Writers from New York City
People's Republic of China emigrants to the United States